The Ardee Baroque Festival is a celebration of music from the seventeenth and eighteenth centuries, which takes place each November in the historic market town of Ardee, County Louth, Republic of Ireland.

The festival is an initiative of the Arts Service of Louth Local Authorities and first took place in 2004. Since its inception, Ardee Baroque has hosted the Irish Baroque Orchestra for the week preceding the performances, as they rehearse two new concert programmes, and deliver an outreach programme which sees the players perform in schools, day-care centres and other community venues. As well as the Irish Baroque Orchestra, Ardee Baroque has hosted performers such as Fionnuala Moynihan, New York Polyphony, Opus Anglicanum, Dunedin Consort and Resurgam.

The Board of  Ardee Baroque is drawn from the local community and works in partnership with the Arts Service in programming, managing and marketing the festival. With financial support from the Arts Council/An Chomhairle Ealaíonn, the festival has grown and developed from small beginnings to become an established weekend on the cultural calendar of north east Ireland. Ardee Baroque has received positive reviews for many of its performances. It has been referred to by The Irish Times as "a music festival that could hold its head up anywhere", and described by The Sunday Times thus - "Of all the boutique music festivals staged around Ireland, the annual celebration of baroque music in the Co Louth town of Ardee is surely the most quaint."

External links
 Official website
 Louth Co Co website
 Irish Baroque Orchestra
 New York Polyphony

Music festivals established in 2004
Music festivals in Ireland
Classical music festivals in Ireland